Pawlikowice  is a village in the administrative district of Gmina Pabianice, within Pabianice County, Łódź Voivodeship, in central Poland.

The village has a population of 500.

References

Pawlikowice